The Berivoi (also: Făgărășel) is a right tributary of the river Racovița in Romania. It discharges into the Racovița in the city Făgăraș.

References

Rivers of Romania
Rivers of Brașov County